Ardoch is a city in Walsh County, North Dakota, United States. The population was 31 at the 2020 census. Ardoch, named for the community of Ardoch, Ontario, was founded in 1881.

Geography
Ardoch is located at  (48.205505, -97.340060).

Demographics

2010 census
As of the census of 2010, there were 67 people, 19 households, and 15 families living in the city. The racial makeup of the city was 91.0% White, 6.0% from other races, and 3.0% from two or more races. Hispanic or Latino of any race were 44.8% of the population.

There were 19 households, of which 47.4% had children under the age of 18 living with them, 47.4% were married couples living together, 26.3% had a female householder with no husband present, 5.3% had a male householder with no wife present, and 21.1% were non-families. 15.8% of all households were made up of individuals, and 5.3% had someone living alone who was 65 years of age or older. The average household size was 3.53 and the average family size was 3.87.

The median age in the city was 29.5 years. 29.9% of residents were under the age of 18; 16.4% were between the ages of 18 and 24; 13.5% were from 25 to 44; 38.8% were from 45 to 64; and 1.5% were 65 years of age or older. The gender makeup of the city was 53.7% male and 46.3% female.

2000 census
As of the census of 2000, there were 61 people, 18 households, and 12 families living in the city. The population density was 235.0 people per square mile (90.6/km2). There were 41 housing units at an average density of 157.9 per square mile (60.9/km2). The racial makeup of the city was 60.66% White, 24.59% from other races, and 14.75% from two or more races. Hispanic or Latino of any race were 54.10% of the population.

There were 18 households, out of which 38.9% had children under the age of 18 living with them, 50.0% were married couples living together, 5.6% had a female householder with no husband present, and 33.3% were non-families. 27.8% of all households were made up of individuals, and 5.6% had someone living alone who was 65 years of age or older. The average household size was 3.39 and the average family size was 4.00.

In the city, the population was spread out, with 45.9% under the age of 18, 1.6% from 18 to 24, 37.7% from 25 to 44, 9.8% from 45 to 64, and 4.9% who were 65 years of age or older. The median age was 28 years. For every 100 females, there were 134.6 males. For every 100 females age 18 and over, there were 135.7 males.

The median income for a household in the city was $21,250, and the median income for a family was $23,750. Males had a median income of $41,875 versus $18,750 for females. The per capita income for the city was $7,306. There were 35.7% of families and 31.4% of the population living below the poverty line, including 21.9% of under eighteens and 58.3% of those over 64.

References

Cities in North Dakota
Cities in Walsh County, North Dakota
Populated places established in 1881
1881 establishments in Dakota Territory